Pierreval is a commune in the Seine-Maritime department in the Normandy region in northern France.

Geography
The A28 autoroute forms the northwest border of the commune.

Population

Places of interest
 The church of St.Martin, dating from the thirteenth century.

People
Marie Juliette Louvet, grandmother of prince Rainier III of Monaco, was born here in 1867.

See also
Communes of the Seine-Maritime department

References

Communes of Seine-Maritime